William Clark Davie (7 January 1925 – 29 January 1996) was a Scottish professional footballer, who played for a number of Scottish and English football clubs during the 1940s and 1950s.

References 

1925 births
1996 deaths
Footballers from Paisley, Renfrewshire
Scottish footballers
Association football inside forwards
St Mirren F.C. players
Luton Town F.C. players
Huddersfield Town A.F.C. players
Walsall F.C. players
Scottish Football League players
English Football League players
Association football midfielders